The Ladies of Liberty Alliance (LOLA) is a network of independent, libertarian women leaders who, through their careers and/or personal endeavors, are dedicated to spreading the ideas of individual liberty and free markets.  Participation in the Ladies of Liberty Alliance is open to any female who identifies with, or is wishing to explore, libertarian ideas.

LOLA participation is free and self-defined.

The mission of the Ladies of Liberty Alliance (LOLA) is to educate and empower female leaders within the liberty movement".

Founding 
In 2009, a group of women concerned about the shortage of female leaders in the fight for liberty started a group to address the problem and called themselves the Ladies of Liberty Alliance (LOLA). For the next three years, LOLA volunteers worked to build a network of libertarian women.  Volunteers spoke at events, conducted outreach to new ladies of liberty, and built a support network to increase the number of women dedicated to becoming leaders within liberty-minded organizations.

In 2011, the overwhelming demand for LOLA from women around the country drove the decision to, under the direction of Nena Whitfield, officially establish Ladies of Liberty Alliance as a full-time, non-profit educational organization with the mission of educating and empowering female leaders within the liberty movement.

Social Chapters 
LOLA Social Chapters are ladies only social groups located in cities throughout the U.S. and abroad, where like-minded women come together to share their passion for personal freedom, establish a strong community through relationship building, and empower one another to be active members of the liberty movement.   LOLA Social chapter events can take on any type of format that best suits their chapter – a policy based discussion, a movie screening, a potluck, or another format that ensures there is a social element to the meeting, which allows attendees to connect, build relationships, and enjoy their time together.

Prior to 2017, the Ladies of Liberty Alliance existed solely in three countries including the United States, Israel, and Northern Ireland. LOLA experienced significant growth in 2018 when they expanded to South America, Africa, and South Asia.

Currently, LOLA social chapters are active in 14 countries across the globe:

North America 
 United States
 Virginia Beach, VA
 Seattle/Tacoma, WA
 Washington D.C.
 Charlotte, NC
 Billings, MT
 Tallahassee, FL
 Twin Cities, MN
 Dallas, Texas
 Phoenix, AZ
 Philadelphia, PA
 Houston, Texas
 Austin, Texas
 Sacramento, CA
 Denver, CO
 Chicago, IL
 Omaha, NE
 Atlanta, GA
 New York, NY
 Los Angeles, CA
 Nashville, TN
 Wisconsin

Africa 
 Nigeria
 Burundi
 Ghana
 Tanzania
 Kenya
 Rwanda

Europe 
 Northern Ireland

South Asia 
 Nepal
 Kathmandu
 Dharan
 India
 Hyderabad
 New Delhi
 Ghaziabad

South America 
 Argentina
 Santiago del Estero
 Chile
 Santiago
 Mexico
 Mexico City
 Brazil
 Santa Catarina
 São Paulo
 Pernambuco
 Distrito Federal
 Parana
 Minas Gerais

Middle East 
 Israel
 Tel Aviv

References

External links
 Ladies of Liberty Alliance

Libertarian organizations